Mélanie Johanna de Jesus dos Santos (born 5 March 2000) is a French artistic gymnast. She is the 2019 European all-around champion, a two time European champion on the floor exercise (2018, 2019), and the 2021 European champion on the balance beam. She is also the 2018 European silver medalist with the French team, the 2019 European silver medalist on the balance beam, and the 2017 European bronze medalist in the all-around. She represented France at the 2020 Summer Olympics where she placed sixth with the team and on the uneven bars and eleventh in the all-around. She is the 2017, 2018, and 2019 French all-around champion, and she won the Longines Prize for Elegance in 2019.

Personal life 
De Jesus dos Santos was born in Schœlcher, Martinique. Her father is Portuguese and her mother is Martinican. She has two half-sisters who live in Portugal with their father. She began gymnastics at age five at a club in La Trinité. She moved to Saint-Etienne in mainland France in 2013 to join the French national team and to train with Eric and Monique Hagard. She speaks French, English and Martinican Creole.

Junior career 
At the 2015 French Championships, de Jesus dos Santos placed second in the all-around behind Lorette Charpy. She also finished fifth on the uneven bars and floor exercise. She helped the French team finish fourth at the 2015 FIT Challenge, and she also placed fourth in the all-around. During the qualification round of the 2015 European Youth Olympic Festival, she tore her ACL while performing a double twisting Yurchenko vault. Due to the injury, she was unable to compete for several months.

Senior career

2016 
De Jesus dos Santos returned to competition in June at the French National Championships in Mulhouse, placing fourth in the all-around, balance beam, and floor exercise. She was not selected for France's 2016 Olympic team. In July, she helped France win a dual meet against Romania, and she won the all-around gold medal. At the Joaquim Blume Memorial in November, she won the silver medal in the all-around behind Belgium's Nina Derwael. She ended her season at the Élite Gym Massilia where she won the balance beam gold medal, the team silver medal, and the all-around bronze medal, and placed fourth on the uneven bars.

2017 
In March, de Jesus dos Santos competed in the American Cup, where she won the bronze medal behind Ragan Smith and Asuka Teramoto. She became the second French gymnast to medal at the American Cup after Elvire Teza won the gold medal in 1997. She then competed at the City of Jesolo Trophy where she placed fourth with the team and on the balance beam, eighth on the uneven bars, and ninth in the all-around.

At the 2017 European Championships in Cluj-Napoca, Romania, de Jesus dos Santos qualified for two finals: the all-around and uneven bars. She finished third in the all-around behind Ellie Downie of Great Britain and Zsófia Kovács of Hungary. She was the first French gymnast to win an all-around medal at the European Championships since Marine Debauve in 2005.

De Jesus dos Santos became the French all-around champion, beating reigning champion Marine Boyer by 1.400 points with a total score of 55.450. She also won a silver medal on the balance beam. She then won the silver medal on the uneven bars at the Paris World Challenge Cup. At the 2017 World Championships in Montreal, she finished fifth in the all-around. After the World Championships, she competed at the Élite Gym Massilia where she won gold medals with the team and on the uneven bars. She also won the silver medal in the all-around behind Angelina Simakova and placed fourth on the floor exercise. Her final competition of the season was the Toyota International where she won the uneven bars gold medal and the balance beam silver medal behind Sanne Wevers.

2018 

At the Doha World Cup, de Jesus dos Santos won the bronze medal on the uneven bars and the gold medal on the balance beam. She then won the bronze medal in the all-around at the Tokyo World Cup behind Mai Murakami and Trinity Thomas. In May, she received three gold medals at the French Championships in the all-around, uneven bars, and floor exercise. She defended her all-around title at the French Championships and also won gold medals on the uneven bars and the floor exercise. She also won the all-around gold medal at the Sainté Gym Cup and helped France win over Germany and Switzerland.

In August, de Jesus dos Santos competed at the European Championships in Glasgow alongside Juliette Bossu, Lorette Charpy, Marine Boyer, Coline Devillard, and they finished first in the qualification round. The French team won the silver medal in the team final, behind Russia. De Jesus dos Santos qualified for two event finals, finishing in sixth place on balance beam and winning gold on floor exercise. She became the third French gymnast to win the floor exercise title at the European Championships after Ludivine Furnon in 2000 and Isabelle Séverino in 2005.

At the Paris World Challenge Cup, de Jesus dos Santos won the gold medal on floor exercise. She was selected to compete at the World Championships alongside Juliette Bossu, Lorette Charpy, Marine Boyer, and Louise Vanhille. The team qualified into the team final for the first time at a major international competition since the 2008 Olympic Games. The team ultimately finished fifth in the team final, their best finish at the World Artistic Gymnastics Championships since 1997. Individually, de Jesus dos Santos qualified for the all-around and floor exercise finals and finished sixth in both. After the World Championships, she competed at the Swiss Cup on a mixed team with Julien Gobaux, and they finished ninth.

2019 
De Jesus dos Santos competed at the EnBW DTB-Pokal Team Challenge in Stuttgart where France placed fourth in the team final. She was selected to compete at the European Championships alongside Marine Boyer, Lorette Charpy, and Coline Devillard. She won the all-around gold medal ahead of the 2017 European Champion Ellie Downie.  In the event finals, she successfully defended her floor exercise title, won silver on balance beam behind Alice Kinsella of Great Britain, and finished seventh on uneven bars. This made her the most decorated female gymnast of the championships, tied with Angelina Melnikova of Russia. She was the first French gymnast to ever win three medals at a single European Championships.

In June, de Jesus dos Santos won her third consecutive French all-around title, and she won the uneven bars and floor exercise titles. On 3 September, she was named to the team to compete at the World Championships in Stuttgart, Germany alongside Lorette Charpy, Marine Boyer, Coline Devillard, and Aline Friess. Later that month she competed at the Paris Challenge Cup where she won gold on uneven bars and placed seventh on balance beam. Then during the qualification round at the World Championships, she led the French team to qualify to the team final in fourth place behind the United States, China, and Russia. Individually, she qualified to the all-around final in third place behind Simone Biles and Sunisa Lee of the United States, the balance beam final in sixth place, and the floor exercise final in fifth place. In the team final, de Jesus dos Santos contributed an all-around score of 55.498 to help France finish in fifth place. This result qualified France for a team spot at the 2020 Olympic Games. In the all-around final, she fell off the uneven bars twice and finished all the way down in twentieth place. In event finals, she still finished off the podium, placing fifth on beam and fifth again on floor. She was awarded the Longines Prize for Elegance alongside American Sam Mikulak.

2020–21
In February, it was announced that de Jesus dos Santos would represent France at the 2020 Tokyo World Cup. However, the event was canceled due to the COVID-19 pandemic in Japan. She did not compete in any international competitions in 2020.

De Jesus dos Santos competed at the 2021 European Championships in Basel. During the qualification round, she only competed on the uneven bars, where she fell, and the balance beam, where she qualified to the event final. During the event finals, she won gold on the balance beam, becoming the first French European Champion on the apparatus. Then at the FIT Challenge, she helped France win the team gold medal, and she won the all-around gold medal and the uneven bars silver medal behind Nina Derwael.

On 14 June, de Jesus dos Santos was selected to represent France at the 2020 Summer Olympics alongside Marine Boyer, Aline Friess, and Carolann Héduit. At the Olympics, de Jesus dos Santos helped France qualify to the team final where they finished sixth. She also placed eleventh in the all-around final with a total score of 53.698. De Jesus dos Santos was initially the first reserve for the uneven bars final but was called up to compete in the final after Simone Biles withdrew. She finished sixth in the final with a score of 14.033.

Following the Olympics, de Jesus dos Santos joined the cast of Biles' Gold Over America Tour.

2022 
In April, de Jesus dos Santos moved to Houston to train at the World Champions Centre, the same gym as Simone Biles, under coaches Cecile and Laurent Landi.  In October de Jesus dos Santos was named to the team to compete at the World Championships in Liverpool alongside Marine Boyer, Coline Devillard, Aline Friess, and Carolann Héduit.

Competitive History

References

External links 

 
 

2000 births
Living people
French female artistic gymnasts
European champions in gymnastics
Martiniquais sportswomen
French people of Portuguese descent
Gymnasts at the 2020 Summer Olympics
Olympic gymnasts of France